Nassarius pumilio is a species of sea snail, a marine gastropod mollusc in the family Nassariidae, the Nassa mud snails or dog whelks.

Description
The shell grows to a length of 4 mm

Distribution
This species occurs in the Atlantic Ocean off Luanda (Angola) and off Guinea-Bissau.

References

 Marrat, F. (1877). On some proposed new forms in the genus Nassa. Liverpool, privately printed, 15 pp., 1 pl.
 Gofas, S.; Afonso, J.P.; Brandào, M. (Ed.). (S.a.). Conchas e Moluscos de Angola = Coquillages et Mollusques d'Angola. [Shells and molluscs of Angola]. Universidade Agostinho / Elf Aquitaine Angola: Angola. 140 pp.

External links
 Smith, E. A. (1872). A list of species of shells from West Africa, with descriptions of those hitherto undescribed. Proceedings of the Zoological Society of London. 1871: 727–739, pl. 75.
 Lamy, E. (1923). Mission du Comte Jean de Polignac et de M. Louis Gain (Campagne du Sylvana 1913): mollusques testacés. Comptes Rendus du Congrès des Sociétés Savantes (Paris). 1922: 22–37
 Cernohorsky W. O. (1984). Systematics of the family Nassariidae (Mollusca: Gastropoda). Bulletin of the Auckland Institute and Museum 14: 1–356
 Adam W. & Knudsen J. 1984. Révision des Nassariidae (Mollusca : Gastropoda Prosobranchia) de l’Afrique occidentale. Bulletin de l’Institut Royal des Sciences Naturelles de Belgique 55(9): 1–95, 5 pl
 

Endemic fauna of Angola
Nassariidae
Gastropods described in 1872